Angelique Cabral is an American actress. She is best known for her roles as Colleen Brandon-Ortega on CBS' sitcom Life in Pieces (2015–2019) and Staff Sergeant Jillian  Perez on Fox's comedy television series Enlisted (2014). She has also appeared in films The Perfect Family (2011), Friends with Benefits (2011) and Band Aid (2017).

Career 

Cabral booked her first professional job at 6 months old in a United Airlines commercial. She has appeared in various commercials, such as Citibank, The Home Depot, Captain Morgan, New York Lotto, Blue Cross and Toyota. Her print campaigns include Verizon, Western Union, Olympus, Redbook, Fed Ex, Loestrin.  In 2004, she made her first on-screen appearance as Mrs. Mendez on CBS' soap opera Guiding Light, in the episode "Episode #1.14503." She made guest appearances in several episodes of One Life to Live and All My Children between 2005 and 2007. Cabral portrayed  Pam Niborski in the romantic comedy film Friends with Benefits (2011) and Angela Rayes in the comedy-drama film The Perfect Family (2011). Friends with Benefits was a commercial success at the box office, grossing over $150.4 million worldwide, against a budget of $35 million. Her stage credits include the Off-Broadway shows "Tape," "Jesse Garon Lives" and "Rubirosa."

She had guest roles on several television shows, including Devious Maids, Two and a Half Men, The Mentalist, Happy Endings, Mad Love, Melrose Place, Bad Judge, State of Affairs, Grey's Anatomy and Criminal Minds. In 2015, she landed the role of Colleen Brandon-Ortega on CBS' sitcom Life in Pieces. The series chronicles the lives of three generations of the Short family as they go about their daily lives in Los Angeles County. The show was canceled by CBS after four seasons on May 10, 2019. In 2016, Cabral was cast as Becca Winograd Diaz in Amazon's animated original series Undone.

Personal life
Her father has Mexican and Native American ancestry and her mother has English and French ancestry. Her mother is cousins with actress Edie McClurg. She has a half brother, Erin. On July 20, 2013, Cabral married marketing director Jason Osborn. The couple has two children, a daughter, Adelaide and a son, Alden.

Filmography

References

External links
 

21st-century American actresses
American film actresses
American television actresses
Living people
Actresses from Honolulu
Year of birth missing (living people)